Custis is a bus rapid transit station in Alexandria, Virginia, located at the intersection of Richmond Highway (U.S. Route 1) and East Custis Avenue. It is a stop on the portion of dedicated bus-only highway along the Metroway bus rapid transit line, providing two-way service along the route. The station provides service to the central Potomac Yard and Potomac communities in Alexandria.

History 

Custis opened to the public as one of the original Metroway stations; the station opened for service on August 24, 2014.

Station layout

References

External links
 Official Metroway site

Buildings and structures in Alexandria, Virginia
Metroway
2014 establishments in Virginia
Transport infrastructure completed in 2014
Bus stations in Virginia